John Sesoga Timu (born August 27, 1992) is an American football coach and former inside linebacker who is a defensive assistant of the Los Angeles Chargers. He played college football for the Huskies before joining the Chicago Bears as an undrafted free agent in 2015. He also spent time with the Salt Lake Stallions.

Early years
Born and raised in Long Beach, California to Samoan American parents, Timu attended Jordan High School in Long Beach. Timu was listed as the 61st overall safety prospect by scout.com.

Professional career
On May 2, 2015, Timu signed with the Chicago Bears as an undrafted free agent following the conclusion of the 2015 NFL Draft. On October 6, 2015, Timu was cut from the team. However, days later, he was resigned to the practice squad. On December 15, 2015, Timu was promoted to the 53-man roster. Timu recorded his first career fumble recovery (Timu had a second one in the same game for a career high of two fumble recoveries) against the Tampa Bay Buccaneers on December 27, 2015. He ended the year with 25 tackles and two fumble recoveries.

On September 3, 2016, Timu was released by the Bears as part of final roster cuts.  He was signed to the practice squad the next day. He was promoted to the active roster on September 27, 2016.

On September 2, 2017, Timu was waived by the Bears and was signed to the practice squad the next day. He was promoted to the active roster on September 23, 2017.

On March 20, 2018, Timu re-signed with the Bears. He was released on September 1, 2018.

Timu was signed by the Salt Lake Stallions of the Alliance of American Football (AAF) on March 13, 2019. The league ceased operations in April 2019.

Coaching career
In September 2019, Timu was hired by Washington head coach Chris Petersen as a graduate assistant.

References

External links
Washington Huskies bio
Chicago Bears bio

1992 births
Living people
American football linebackers
Washington Huskies football players
Chicago Bears players
Players of American football from Long Beach, California
American sportspeople of Samoan descent
Salt Lake Stallions players
Washington Huskies football coaches
Los Angeles Chargers coaches